Pterotaea albescens is a moth of the family Geometridae. It is found in California and Oregon.

References

Moths described in 1941
Boarmiini